Archie Lee Harris, Jr. (born November 17, 1964) is a retired professional American football player for the National Football League's Denver Broncos. He played offensive tackle for three games in 1987.  Harris played college football at William & Mary.

References

1964 births
Living people
American football offensive guards
American football offensive tackles
Denver Broncos players
Players of American football from Richmond, Virginia
William & Mary Tribe football players